Shenyang Mandarin is a dialect of Northeastern Mandarin used by people in and around Shenyang, the capital of Liaoning province and the largest city in Northeast China. It is very close to Standard Chinese but has some notably distinctive words. Some people consider it a strong accent rather than a distinct dialect. Because of its similarity to the standard language, pinyin can be used to represent its pronunciation. Its usage is dwindling as schools in Shenyang teach only the standard language. 

The most distinctive aspect of the Shenyang dialect is the much lower pitch of the first tone than in Standard Mandarin. It would be positioned at 2, rather than 5, on the chart shown (right).  As a result, it can sound rather like the third tone.

Like the Beijing dialect, the Shenyang dialect is characterized by erhua (儿化).

Some of the words in the Shenyang dialect come from other languages like the Manchu language. One example is 旮旯儿 gālár 'corner'.

Examples of words in various Northeastern dialects (not necessarily specific to Shenyang) include:

Phonology
Shenyang dialect has 19 initial consonants, as opposed to the 21 in Standard Mandarin. While lost in Standard Mandarin, Middle Chinese  is preserved in the Shenyang dialect.  also exists in the Shenyang dialect.

Standard Mandarin diphthongs tend to be pronounced as monophthongs in the Shenyang dialect. For example,  becomes , and  becomes .

References

Mandarin Chinese